Herod Agrippa II (AD 27/28 –  or 100), officially named Marcus Julius Agrippa and sometimes shortened to Agrippa, was the last ruler from the Herodian dynasty, reigning over territories outside of Judea as a Roman client. Agrippa II fled Jerusalem in 66, fearing the Jewish uprising and supported the Roman side in the First Jewish–Roman War.

Early life
Herod Agrippa II was the son of the first and better-known Herod Agrippa and the brother of Berenice, Mariamne, and Drusilla (second wife of the Roman procurator Antonius Felix). He was educated at the court of the emperor Claudius, and at the time of his father's death he was only seventeen years old. Claudius therefore kept him at Rome, and sent Cuspius Fadus as procurator of the Roman province of Judaea. While at Rome, he voiced his support for the Jews to Claudius, and against the Samaritans and the procurator of Iudaea Province, Ventidius Cumanus, who was lately thought to have been the cause of some disturbances there.

Rise in power
On the death of king Herod of Chalcis in 48, his small Syrian realm of Chalcis was given to Agrippa, with the right of superintending the Temple in Jerusalem and appointing its high priest, but only as a tetrarch.

In 53, Agrippa was forced to give up the tetrarchy of Chalcis but in exchange Claudius made him ruler with the title of king over the territories previously governed by Philip, namely, Iturea, Trachonitis, Batanea, Gaulanitis, Auranitis and Paneas, as well as the kingdom of Lysanias in Abila. The tetrarchy of Chalcis was subsequently in 57 given to his cousin, Aristobulus. Herod Agrippa celebrated by marrying off his two sisters Mariamne and Drusilla. Flavius Josephus, the Jewish historian, repeats the gossip that Agrippa lived in an incestuous relationship with his sister, Berenice.

In 55, the Emperor Nero added to Agrippa's realm the cities of Tiberias and Taricheae in Galilee, and Livias (Iulias), with fourteen villages near it, in Peraea.

It was before Agrippa and his sister Berenice that, according to the New Testament, Paul the Apostle pleaded his case at Caesarea Maritima, probably in 59 or 60.

Agrippa expended large sums in beautifying Jerusalem and other cities, especially Berytus (ancient Beirut), a Hellenised city in Phoenicia. His partiality for the latter rendered him unpopular amongst his own subjects, and the capricious manner in which he appointed and deposed the high priests made him disliked by his coreligionists.

During Jewish-Roman War
In the seventeenth year of Agrippa's reign (corresponding with the 12th year of Nero's reign, or 65/66 AD), Agrippa tried desperately to avert a war with Rome, when he saw his countrymen generally disposed to fight against Rome, because of certain insults and abuses they had had under the Roman procurator, Gessius Florus. At this time, they had broken-off the cloisters leading from Antonia Fortress to the Temple Mount where Roman soldiers went to keep guard during the Jewish holidays, and they refused to pay the tribute which was due to Caesar. Agrippa convened the people and urged instead that they tolerate the temporary injustices done to them and submit themselves to Roman hegemony. At length, Agrippa failed to prevent his subjects from rebelling, whereas, during a certain holiday when the Roman governor of Syria, Cestius Gallus, had passed through Judea to quell the rebellion, he was routed by Jewish forces. By 66 the citizenry of Jerusalem expelled their king, Agrippa, and his sister, Berenice, from Jerusalem. During the First Jewish–Roman War of 66–73, he sent 2,000 men, archers and cavalry, to support Vespasian, showing that, although a Jew, he was entirely devoted to the Roman Empire. He accompanied Titus on some campaigns, and was wounded at the siege of Gamla. After the capture of Jerusalem, he went with his sister Berenice to Rome, where he was invested with the dignity of praetor and rewarded with additional territory.

Relations with Josephus
Agrippa had a great intimacy with the historian Josephus, having supplied him with information for his history, Antiquities of the Jews. Josephus preserved two of the letters he received from him.

Death
According to the patriarch Photius I of Constantinople, Agrippa died, childless, at the age of seventy, in the third year of the reign of Trajan, that is, 100, but statements of historian Josephus, in addition to the contemporary epigraphy from his kingdom, cast this date into serious doubt. The modern scholarly consensus holds that he died before 93/94. He was the last prince from the House of Herod.

Ancestry

See also
Herodian kingdom
List of Hasmonean and Herodian rulers
1st century in Lebanon

References

Sources
 
 
 Yohanan Aharoni & Michael Avi-Yonah, "The MacMillan Bible Atlas", Revised Edition, p. 156 (1968 & 1977 by Carta Ltd.).

Further reading

External links

 Jewish Encyclopedia: Agrippa II
 Agrippa II – Article in historical sourcebook by Mahlon H. Smith
 Livius.org: Julius Marcus Agrippa

|-

27 births
90s deaths
Year of death unknown
1st-century Herodian rulers
1st-century Jews
1st-century monarchs in the Middle East
1st-century Romans
Herodian dynasty
Judea (Roman province)
Judean people
Herod Agrippa
People in Acts of the Apostles
People of the First Jewish–Roman War
Roman client rulers